The 2003 University of Oxford election for the position of Chancellor was called upon the death of the incumbent Chancellor, Roy Jenkins, Baron Jenkins of Hillhead on 5 January 2003.

Electorate

The electorate consisted of all members of the University holding the rank of MA. Votes had to be cast in person at Oxford. To stand, a candidate had to be nominated by two MAs.

It was the first such election to be held in which voters were not required to wear academic dress to vote. It was also the first election to use the instant-runoff vote, after the previous election by first past the post in 1987 saw two conservative candidates (Robert Blake, Baron Blake and Sir Edward Heath) splitting the conservative vote at 2,500 each, allowing social democrat Roy Jenkins to win with 3,500 votes.

Candidates
Four candidates were nominated:

Lord Bingham of Cornhill, 69, senior Law Lord, former Lord Chief Justice and former Master of the Rolls
Lord Neill of Bladen QC, 76, former Warden of All Souls, former Vice-Chancellor of Oxford University, and former Chairman of the Committee on Standards in Public Life
Chris Patten, 58, European Union Commissioner for external affairs, former cabinet minister and last Governor of Hong Kong
Sandi Toksvig, 44, stand-up comedian and broadcaster

The campaign
For much of the race, Chris Patten was generally considered to be the front-runner, due to his high profile as the last Governor of Hong Kong. The bookmaker William Hill offered odds of 7/4 for Mr Patten, 9/4 for Lord Bingham, 11/4 for Lord Neill, and 3/1 for Toksvig.

Sandi Toksvig was the candidate most vociferously opposed to the government's proposed top-up fees, and so received the endorsement of the Oxford University Student Union. However, as most of the union's members were undergraduates, they did not have a vote in the election itself. Lord Neill also declared himself opposed to top-up fees, but said in his candidates' statement that he preferred not to make this the basis of his campaign.

Result

Polling ran over two days, on 14 and 15 March 2003. The results went to two rounds before one candidate secured more than 50% of the vote.

First round

Second round

See also
List of chancellors of the University of Oxford

Notes

2003
2003 elections in the United Kingdom
2003 in England
2000s in Oxford